Fulham East was a borough constituency in the Metropolitan Borough of Fulham in London.  It was represented in the House of Commons of the Parliament of the United Kingdom from 1918 to 1955.  Elections were held using the first-past-the-post voting system.

At the 1918 general election the previous Fulham constituency was divided into two constituencies, Fulham East and Fulham West; the two halves were re-united for the 1955 general election. At the 1997 general election, the Fulham constituency was replaced by Hammersmith and Fulham.

Boundaries
The Metropolitan Borough of Fulham wards of Barons Court, Lillie, Sands End, and Walham.

Members of Parliament

Election results

Election in the 1910s

Election in the 1920s

Election in the 1930s

Election in the 1940s

Elections in the 1950s

References 

Parliamentary constituencies in London (historic)
Constituencies of the Parliament of the United Kingdom established in 1918
Constituencies of the Parliament of the United Kingdom disestablished in 1955
Politics of the London Borough of Hammersmith and Fulham
Fulham